Hrach Gregorian (born 1949 in Tehran, Iran) is an American political consultant, educator, and writer.  His work in both the private and public sectors has been mainly focused in the field of international conflict management and post-conflict peacebuilding. Gregorian holds academic appointments in universities in the United States and Canada, and writes extensively on such subjects as terrorism, conflict management, peacebuilding, national security, and conflict hot spots throughout the world. His work as a consultant, conflict management specialist, and trainer has taken him to Angola, Argentina, Bosnia-Herzegovina, Cambodia, Croatia, Cyprus, Estonia, Ethiopia, Greece, Guatemala, Hungary, Israel, Italy, Lebanon, Nigeria, Northern Ireland, Singapore, Thailand, and Ukraine. Gregorian regularly provides professional skills training, seminars, and workshops for United Nations agency and mission staff, United States and Latin American military personnel, senior civilian officials, and academic and corporate leaders in the U.S. and throughout the world.

Early life and education
Gregorian was born to Armenian parents in Tehran, Iran in 1949 and immigrated to the United States in 1958. He spent his formative years in Watertown, Massachusetts, graduating from high school in 1968. He received his BA in Political Science from Boston University in 1972 where he studied under Howard Zinn. Although primarily focused on academics, he was an outdoor enthusiast and co-founded the Snake Hill Mountain Club with Ken Ryan in 1971. Gregorian received his MA (1974) and PhD (1980) degrees from Brandeis University in International Relations. He held academic posts at Kenyon College and Simmons College before beginning a career in government service.

Government service
In 1985, Gregorian was asked to join the National Endowment for the Humanities where he served as Humanist Administrator and Coordinator for the Foundations of American Society Initiative until 1988. He then moved to the United States Institute of Peace (USIP), where he served as the director of various grant, training, and education programs until 1994. It was at the USIP that Gregorian established his career focus on conflict resolution and post-conflict peace building: He designed and directed conflict resolution skills training programs for foreign affairs professionals; provided training for government and party officials in Cambodia, Foreign Service officers at the Thai Foreign Ministry, and military officers from Latin America at the Inter-American Defense College; and designed and managed an environmental conflict resolution training seminar in Budapest, Hungary for senior officials from nine states of the Danube River basin.

Peace work
Gregorian has undertaken numerous projects across the globe to promote peace and reconciliation. He collaborated with Dr. Yiannis Laouris in Cyprus to found the Technology for peace foundation which in the late 90s supported peace builders communicate across the Green Line. The project was partly funded by USAID and USIP. A virtual negotiation element was supported by the University of Maryland. He also supported as an advisor an EC large-scale peace and reconciliation project in the Middle East known as Act Beyond Borders.

Private sector
Gregorian is a founder and principle of a number of private institutes focused on teaching conflict resolution and training professionals in peace building.  He is a board member of multiple international institutes that focus on conflict resolution, and has consulted over the world on issues of peace building.

Private institutions
1.	Institute of World Affairs, Washington, D.C. - President
2.	de novo group, Washington, D.C. - President and CEO
3.	Gettysburg Integrated Solutions, Gettysburg, PA - Founding Partner
4.	Peacebuilding, Development and Security Program (PDSP), Centre for Military and Strategic Studies, University of Calgary, Alberta, Canada - Co-director
5.	IAQ Inc., Oakton, VA (2003 – 06) - Vice President, Consulting Services
6.	Hammer-Gregorian, LLC, Washington, DC (2000 – 03) - Founder and Co-director
7.	IDR Associates, Washington, D.C.(1994 – 96) - Founding Director

Board member
1.	Institute of World Affairs (ex officio)
2.	Alliance for Peacebuilding (cofounder and board member)
3.	National Peace Foundation; Strategic Trade Advisory Group, Ltd. (advisor)
4.	The Cypress Fund (advisory board)
5.	Psychology Without Borders (International Advisory Board)

Consultancies
1.	Center for Civic Education
2.	Iowa Peace Institute
3.	Mc Knight Foundation
4.	National Peace Institute Foundation
5.	United States Department of Justice
6.	Voice of America
7.	The Strategic Trade Advisory Group, Ltd.
8.	Arcadia Group Worldwide, Inc.
9.	The Inter-American Defense College
10.	JPS Solutions; Anchor Consulting
11.	United States Army Foreign Military Studies Office
12.	United States Department of Homeland Security
13.	United States Army Training and Doctrine Command
14.	United States Army Intelligence and Security Command
15.	Naval Postgraduate School
16.	United States Joint Forces Command
17.	Canadian Defence and Foreign Affairs Institute

Academia
Gregorian is keenly interested in public service and training others to work in conflict resolution and peacebuilding. He firmly believes that, in local, national, and international spheres, capable trained professionals make a profound difference in resolving conflict, building peace, and dealing with post conflict situations. In furtherance of these goals, he holds academic positions at the following universities:
1.	The American University, Washington, DC - Adjunct Professor, School of International Service
2.	Royal Roads University, Victoria, BC, Canada - Associate Faculty Member, Conflict Management Programs
3.	University of Calgary,  Calgary, Alberta, Canada - Adjunct Professor, Faculty of Social Sciences, Centre for Military and Strategic Studies

Family
Gregorian and his younger sister Victoria (Vicky) immigrated from Tehran, Iran in 1956 with his parents Asik and Juliet, both formerly of the Soviet Republic of Armenia. His sister Janet was born after their arrival to the United States. Both of his parents have since died. His sister Vicky Gregorian, mother of 2, is an executive in the television industry, and his sister Janet Gregorian-Michaelsen, married with 3 children, is a social worker, and advocate in the field of autism in Connecticut. In 1974 Gregorian married Judith Kramer of Bethpage, Long Island, New York. She is a program specialist with the United States Department of Education. They remain happily married and have three children: Jamie, a lawyer and lobbyist in Washington, DC; Nicolas, a sports marketer in Boston; and Alexis, a federal prosecutor in Los Angeles.

Articles available on the internet
Jihadi Threats in the Sahara and Sahel

The Empty Core in Al Qaeda’s Vision for Iraq

Political Islam in West Africa and the Sahel

Oil: the West’s soft underbelly

Rewriting Canada’s security laws

References

1950 births
People from Tehran
Iranian emigrants to the United States
Boston University College of Arts and Sciences alumni
Brandeis University alumni
Kenyon College faculty
Simmons University faculty
American political consultants
American people of Armenian descent
Iranian people of Armenian descent
Living people
Watertown High School (Massachusetts) alumni